Hans Marr (7 October 1914 – 10 March 1942) was a German ski jumper. He competed in the individual event at the 1936 Winter Olympics. He was killed in action during World War II.

References

External links
 

1914 births
1942 deaths
German male ski jumpers
Olympic ski jumpers of Germany
Ski jumpers at the 1936 Winter Olympics
People from Schmalkalden-Meiningen
German military personnel killed in World War II
Sportspeople from Thuringia